Khairil Nizam bin Khirudin (born 16 October 1979) is a Malaysian politician and engineer who has served as Senator from December 2020 until November 2022. Currently he is a member of the Parliament of Malaysia for Jerantut. He is a member of the Malaysian Islamic Party (PAS), a component party of the ruling Perikatan Nasional (PN) coalition. He served as the Youth Wing Chief of PN from November 2020 to January 2022 and of PAS from June 2019 to November 2021.

Election results

Awards and recognition

Order 
  :
  Companion of the Order of the Defender of the Realm (JMN) (2021)

Career recognition 

 International certification: API 510 (Pressure Vessel Inspection Code), API 570 (Piping Inspection Code), API 580 (Risk Based Inspection), API 653 (Tank Inspection, Repair, Alteration and Reconstruction)
 Malaysia certification: OSR Inspector (Pressure Vessel and Crane)

References

Living people
1979 births
Malaysian people of Malay descent
Malaysian Muslims
People from Perak
Malaysian Islamic Party politicians
Members of the Dewan Negara
21st-century Malaysian politicians